In Sickness and in Health is a BBC television sitcom that ran between 1 September 1985 and 3 April 1992. It is a sequel to the successful Till Death Us Do Part, which ran between 1966 and 1975, and Till Death..., which ran for one series of six episodes in 1981. The series includes 47 episodes, and, unlike its predecessor, all the episodes have survived and are available on DVD.

The show's theme tune was performed by Chas and Dave and two versions of the lyrics were used – the original version in Series 1 and then revised from Series 2 onward to reflect the Else Garnett character's death. The lyrics were changed again for the episodes set in Australia during the fourth series.

Cast
 Warren Mitchell as Alfred 'Alf' Garnett
 Dandy Nichols as Else Garnett (Series 1)
 Una Stubbs as Rita Rawlins (Series 1–2)
 Arthur English as Arthur (Series 1–5)
 Eamonn Walker as Winston ('Marigold') (Series 1–3)
 Ken Campbell as Fred Johnson
 Eileen Kenally as Mrs Johnson (Series 1–3)
 Gareth Forwood as The Doctor (Series 3)
 Tricia Kelly as Mrs Johnson (Series 4–5)
 Yvonne D'Alpra as Mrs Johnson (Series 6)
 Harry Fowler as Harry the milkman
 Arnold Diamond as Mr Rabinsky (Series 1–4)
 Carmel McSharry as Camille Hollingbery (Series 1–6)
 Patricia Hayes as Min Reed (Series 2–5)
 Irene Handl as Gwenneth (Series 2–3)
 Renu Setna as Mr Kittel (Series 2–3)
 Fanny Carby as The Barmaid (Series 3–5)
 Vas Blackwood as Pele (Series 4)
 Hugh Lloyd as Harry Carey (Series 4–6)
 Pat Coombs as Mrs Carey (Series 4–6)
 James Ellis as Michael (Series 6)

Episode guide

Series 1 (1985)
This comedy series debuted in 1985 and took the former Till Death Us Do Part characters Alf Garnett (Warren Mitchell) and his wife Else (Dandy Nichols) from their Wapping house to a lower-class one-level flat in West Ham. Else now uses a wheelchair due to Nichols' real-life ill health.

The council sends a black, gay man named Winston (Eamonn Walker), to do the housework and help care for Else. Despite Alf's dual prejudices against Winston, eventually the two become used to one another, and Winston takes Alf to watch his beloved West Ham United. Nevertheless, Alf gives Winston the nickname "Marigold".

Alf and Else's daughter Rita (Una Stubbs) now lives with her husband Mike in his hometown of Liverpool and often visits her parents, although Mike does not appear (as Antony Booth had no interest in reprising the role). Usually, Alf is seen drinking with his friend Arthur (Arthur English) in the local pub.

Although his beloved Conservative Party has returned to power, Alf is not happy with Margaret Thatcher being Prime Minister because, according to him, "a woman's place is in the home". He is also unhappy about Else needing to use a wheelchair and the fact he has to push her around everywhere and that, after a lifetime of hard work and paying contributions to the Welfare State, he has to fight the social security system for a decent living allowance.

Across the road lives Fred Johnson (Ken Campbell), a man stubborn like Alf, with whom he rarely gets along. When angry, Johnson bumps his head on the wall. His wife (first played by Eileen Kennally, from Series 1 to 3, then by Tricia Kelly in Series 4 and 5, and Yvonne D'Alpra in Series 6) suffers from anxiety. Much of the comedy surrounding the Johnsons is based on Mrs. Johnson's sympathy towards Alf, often letting him walk all over them and much to the anger of Mr. Johnson.

Christmas Special (1985)

Series 2 (1986)
The first series ended on 13 October 1985 and was very popular in the ratings. On Boxing Day a Christmas special was aired, which was also successful. On 6 February 1986 Dandy Nichols died, aged 78.

When Dandy Nichols died, the decision was taken to continue the series, as the ratings and audience appreciation had been excellent. By the first episode of series two, her character has died of natural causes. Left alone after all the other mourners have gone home, Alf, the belligerent old curmudgeon who always treated his wife appallingly, gently touches the handle of her (now empty) wheelchair and sobs "Silly old moo!".  However, Alf quickly discovers his state pension has been cut (along with entitlement to other social security benefits) as a result of Else's death.  The lyrics of the theme tune (performed by Chas and Dave) were changed to reflect this:

Now my 'ol darlin
They've laid her down to rest
And now I'm missing 'er with all me heart
But they don't give a monkeys down the DHSS
And they've cornered half me pension for a start

So it won't be very long until I'm by her side 
Cos I'll probably starve to death that's what I'll do
For richer or for poorer - Bloody poorer that's a fact!
That's 'cos in sickness and in health I said 'I do
In sickness and in health I said 'I do

In series two, Carmel McSharry became a permanent member of the cast playing Mrs Hollingbery, a gossipy, Catholic pensioner who lives in the flat upstairs. She did make an appearance in the first series but this was very low-key, and she had not been named as Mrs Hollingbery either yet. Alf and Mrs Hollingbery don't get on at first but later become close. The roles of the Johnsons increased, and several recurring characters were added including Mr Rabinsky (a tightfisted Jew), Mr Kittel (Renu Setna) a Muslim shopkeeper, Winston's cousin, and the milkman. Alf's crazy former neighbour Min Reed (Patricia Hayes) also returns for one episode, along with her sister Gwenneth (Irene Handl).

Christmas Special (1986)

Series 3 (1987)
During the third series, Rita divorces Mike and moves back to London to marry a doctor (although Una Stubbs did not appear in the show after series two). Eamonn Walker also left at the end of series three. Three characters from the 1970s Till Death Us Do Part also made a comeback - Mrs. Carey and her henpecked husband Wally (Pat Coombs and Hugh Lloyd, although Wally was now named Harry). Min also returns for a appearance, along with her sister Gwenneth who makes her second and final appearance in the series, as Handl passed away later that year.

Christmas Special (1987)

Series 4 (1989) 
Alf gets a new lodger, Pele, and Mrs Hollingbery starts to get closer to Alf. Eventually, Alf begins courting her and they are soon engaged. Mrs Hollingberry learns that as a couple, they can purchase their house for £20,000. Later in the series, with Arthur in tow, they travel to the Outback to meet her wealthy long-lost brother Ricky (John Bluthal) so they can get his blessing on their engagement and provide them the money towards the purchase of the house. Alf soon comes to blows with her brother and they have a fight at a drinks party to celebrate his engagement to Mrs Hollingberry. Ricky expels them and sends them back to London with their plans in disarray.

Christmas Special (1989)

Series 5 (1990) 
Series five was broadcast in 1990. These episodes focused on the build-up to Alf and Mrs. Hollingberry's big day which would end in disaster when the pair fall out at the altar over the revised terms and conditions of the ceremony. Alf objecting to the removal of the "I obey" clause by the wife. Just as she rejects and abandons him in the church, Alf is reminded by Fred that he has had a "lucky escape", to which Alf angrily replies, "What do you mean? I could have watched the bloody football!!".

Christmas Special (1990)

Series 6 (1992) 
In 1992, after over a year off the air, the sitcom returned for the sixth and final series of seven episodes in which Alf discovers a ton of banknotes and becomes very rich. During the final series, Arthur did not appear, due to Arthur English suffering from ill health, and so Alf gained a new friend, the Irishman Michael (played by James Ellis). Tricia Kelly departed, so Mrs. Johnson runs off with another woman. The character did briefly appear in this series, but was portrayed by Yvonne D'Alpra (the third person to play the role). The last episode aired on 3 April 1992.

History

After the cancellation
Warren Mitchell would continue to perform as Alf Garnett on special occasions; this meant on stage in front of a live audience, and similarly to an invited audience consisting largely of celebrities and public figures.

In 1997, a number of special shows were arranged for Granada Television, in which Alf would be in his front room in the company of Mrs Hollingberry or in the pub with a drinking partner. The material was written by Johnny Speight and Alf now grumbles about the Labour Party being returned to power under Tony Blair.

After Johnny Speight's death in 1998, Warren Mitchell decided that he no longer wanted to play Alf.

International versions
In 1991 a Dutch version of the series, In voor en tegenspoed ("In good times and in bad"), debuted on Dutch TV. According to the end credits only the first 12 episodes are based on Speight's original scripts. Two more series of episodes were written by Paul-Jan Nelissen and Marc Nelissen. The Dutch Alf Garnett is called Fred Schuit (played by Rijk de Gooyer). He lives in Amsterdam, supports AFC Ajax, drinks jenever for medicinal reasons, and does not trust a TV-set unless it is made in Eindhoven. The series was awarded two Awards of the Dutch Academy.

The American counterpart to this series is Archie Bunker's Place, which preceded In Sickness and in Health by six years.

DVD releases 
Series 1: 9 June 2008
Series 2: 22 September 2008
Christmas Specials: 3 November 2008
Series 3: 23 March 2009
Series 4: 13 July 2009
Series 5: 12 July 2010
Series 6: 13 September 2010
The Complete Collection: 13 September 2010

References

External links

In Sickness and in Health at IMDb
In Sickness and in Health at British Comedy Guide
Creator of series, Johnny Speight

1980s British sitcoms
1985 British television series debuts
1990s British sitcoms
1992 British television series endings
BBC television sitcoms
British television spin-offs
English-language television shows
Till Death Us Do Part